The Lancia Ypsilon is a supermini manufactured and marketed by Lancia, now in its third generation and as of 2022, the marque's only model. The Ypsilon was released in 1995, as a larger and more expensive replacement to the Y10. Between 1995 and 2005, Lancia produced more than 870,000 Ypsilons in the Melfi plant in the Potenza region.

The third generation Ypsilon, sharing its platform with the Fiat 500, was marketed also as the Chrysler Ypsilon in the United Kingdom, Ireland and Japan. Fiat Group discontinued the Chrysler variant in 2017, having marketed 2,000 units in 2014. It is also no longer sold in Japan, with the discontinuation of both the Lancia Voyager and Lancia Thema branding on Chrysler-built vehicles in 2015. It is currently only available in the Italian market.

First generation (1995)

1995–2000

The Lancia Y (Type 840) was designed by Enrico Fumia in 1992. It was developed over 24 months at a cost of around 400 billion Italian lira and was presented in Rome in January 1996. The arches defined the car, repeating themselves on all sides of the car. The length is 3.72 m, 33 cm longer than the Y10. The Lancia Y was built on the platform of the Fiat Punto series 176 (the same platform as the Palio and Barchetta), with a redesigned trailing arm independent rear suspension, connected by a stabilizer bar, to provide a more comfortable and refined driving experience, while suspension at the front remained of the independent MacPherson type.

The main features of the Lancia Y include five seats, a soft plastic dashboard, and accessories, and options, including body colors in 100 shades from the Lancia Kaleidoscope catalog. Another design property that distinguished the Y was the instrument cluster in the center of the dashboard, which was adopted by the Musa and Ypsilon later in 2003.

Initially, the range featured three trim levels: LE, LS, and LX. A Cosmopolitan special edition of 600 pieces was later added. It was created through collaboration with the magazine, based on the LX trim. It was sold in the European market outside of Italy.

Air conditioning was standard on the LX and an option on the LS. The LX also offered an enhanced instrument cluster with a rev counter and a larger display that also displayed the outside temperature.

The engines were part of the FIRE series that debuted in the Y10 in 1985 and later was used in other Fiat and Lancia vehicles. They were available in displacements of 1,108 and 1,242cc with eight valves in an overhead camshaft arrangement. Given the limited success of the Pratola Serra engine, it was soon replaced by the first so-called SuperFIRE engine, featuring four valves per cylinder and multipoint fuel injection. The Lancia Y was the first car to receive this evolution of the FIRE.

The 1,242cc SuperFIRE developed  at 6,000 rpm and a maximum torque of 113 Nm at 4,500 rpm. This engine remains available on the 2013 Lancia Ypsilon, 2013 Ford Ka, and the Fiat 500.

The Elefantino Rosso (English: Tiny Red Elephant, which was the symbol of the historic Lancia HF sports cars that won numerous rally competitions) is the sports version of the Lancia Y and the sister car to the Fiat Punto Sporting. It features an interior in grey Alcantara, seats also in grey Alcantara and accentuated with dark grey fabric insets that echo the exterior color of the car, a center console, 15" wheels and rear-view mirrors in a titanium look, the steering wheel and gearshift in grey leather with red stitching, air conditioning, a shorter gearbox ratio for quicker acceleration from 0–100 km/h and in 5th gear, a lowered and stiffened suspension with bigger roll bars and more direct power steering. It reached a top speed of 177 km/h and was the only car in the lineup to receive 15" wheels with 195/50R15 tires. For those who desired a more discreet, comfortable, and luxurious ride, the LX (with an  Alcantara and walnut veneer interior) and LS were also available with SuperFIRE. They were able to reach the same top speed as the "Pratola Serra" versions. The 1.2 8V was available with an automatic ECVT transmission.

Lancia had pulled out of RHD markets two years prior to the Y's launch. Thus, no RHD version was developed.

The Italian magazine Quattroruote test drove the "Ypsilon 16V LX" beyond its usual city use and praised its excellent power reserves while offering the comforts of a car worthy of a higher price. The Lancia Ypsilon was featured in Gran Turismo 2. The model was an immediate success selling over 42,000 units in the first two months.

2000–2003

In October 2000 the exterior and interior were restyled. The external changes included a new, larger grille, new bumpers, new taillights, new wheel cover designs, new fog lights. The side moldings of the car became much smoother and body-colored. The most significant internal change was the headrests (instead of drilled solids) and new seats and new steering wheel (similar to that of the Lancia Lybra). The material was no longer available with "soft touch", reflective security was removed from the doors, the climate control button was replaced with a lever, and the instrument panel was made more readable and modern, especially in the use of the LED display. The length of the car increased slightly from 3.72 metres to 3.74 metres.

The LX and Red Elephant versions, which cost €15,060 list, came with the standard including driver and passenger airbags, air conditioning, ABS, power steering, Blaupunkt radio/navigation system with 6 speakers, split rear seat with headrests, the Alcantara interior, outdoor temperature display, electrically operated door mirrors painted in body color, the helm station and instrument panel were red instead of green, central locking with remote control, power windows, adjustable seat and steering wheel, leather interior with red stitching on the Red Elephant, fog lamps and alloy wheels with 185/60 R 14 tires for the LX and 195/50 R15 for the Red Elephant.

The following years were marketed by other special versions: DoDo, Vanity and Unica. 16v versions reduce their output of  due to new Euro 3 pollution standards. Emissions were reduced with a more linear delivery, while maintaining, and sometimes even increasing, consumption.

Lancia reduced power from 60 PS on the 1242 cc, due to the addition of the sequential multipoint fuel injection system, costing power.

It also removed the  engine 1108 option, as it had not yet been adapted to the new Euro 3 directive, leaving the  1.2 8v and 1.2 16v .

In September 2003, after nearly nine years of career and just above 804,600 units sold, its successor, the Lancia Ypsilon debuted, replacing it completely the following year.

Engines

All versions
 Lancia Y LE (1996)
 Lancia Y LS (1996)
 Lancia Y LX (1996)
 Lancia Y Elefantino Blu (1997)
 Lancia Y Elefantino Rosso (1997)
 Lancia Y Cosmopolitan (1998)
 Lancia Y Marie Claire (2000)
 Lancia Y DoDo (2001)
 Lancia Y Vanity (2001)
 Lancia Y Unica (2002)
 Lancia Y Caprice

Safety
The Y was awarded 2 stars in the Euro NCAP crash test for adult protection and Euro NCAP 2-star certification for pedestrian safety.
 Adult occupant = 
 Pedestrian =

Second generation (2003)

2003–2006
The Ypsilon (Type 843) was Introduced in 2003 to access the Lancia range. It was designed to meet the needs of a young audience, and over time found sales, especially to females. It became the best-selling car of the Lancia range with an annual production of about 60,000 units. It was initially assembled at the Fiat plant in Melfi. In June 2005 production was moved to Sicily at the plant in Termini Imerese Palermo. The car uses a three-door body about 3.78 meters long, with the design inspired by the historic Lancia Ardea.

The front is characterized by a large chrome grille with lobes at the top. The lighting is placed at the ends of the front arch. Bumpers are characterized by the presence of a coating applied to the fascia. Above the air, intakes are the fog lights (in versions of the tip). A prominent rib runs along the sides. The glazing frames are chrome-plated versions of the tip. The tail has vertically oriented headlamps that culminate in the bumper and are integrated into the fenders. The rear tailgate has a small size that limits visibility, embellished by chromed fascia above the license plate.

The frame used a shortened version of the B platform debuted with the Fiat Punto (188) and adopted also by the Fiat Idea and Lancia Musa. The engine is transverse front-mounted, with front-wheel drive. The front independent suspensions are MacPherson struts with stabilizer bar, with steel arms, while at the rear there is a semi-independent torsion beam suspension. Ventilated front disc and rear drum brakes were available only for the home versions. Sport MomoDesign provided the four-disc brakes with stiffened suspension and trim for other models. All versions included anti-wheel drive lock (ABS) with Electronic Brake Distribution (EBD) and an electric power steering system that stiffens gradually, but among the options are combined  electronic stability control and traction.

The interior is covered with plastic inserts on door panels and instrument panel is covered with Airtex fabric, leather or Alcantara depending on the model. Two-tone upholstery and plastic inserts mimic aluminium. The upholstery is available in four different materials: "glamorous", Airtex, suede, and leather. It offers large storage space in front of the driver and passenger. The air conditioning and radio controls were located in the central area, including the optional navigation system.

2006–2010

In autumn 2006 the Ypsilon received a touch-up that affected the engines and internals. It had a new front grille, more rounded bumpers with enlarged air intakes, and rear light clusters with chrome-effect ice. There are five versions: Silver, Passion, White Gold, Yellow Gold, and Platinum. New fabrics for the seats came with new combinations of colors. Finishes on the bridge are painted silver or dark gray. The car has a new 1.3 Multijet 16v engine of 75, 90, or 105 horses. It also offered Blue&Me hands-free (Bluetooth with USB port), new colors, and new wheels.

The new Ypsilon can be equipped with pay-Electronic Stability Control and Hill Holder, a 0.93 g of grip, even if the rolling is accentuated by the soft suspension calibration. The shift lever is in a raised position and the split rear bench seat and sliding. The 2008 model introduced a DPF particulate filter as standard on all diesel engines except the 105 horsepower 1.3 Multijet diesel with the automated manual transmission D.F.N. (Dolce Far Niente).

2010–2011

In 2010, the exterior mirrors increased in size and darkened headlamps appeared. In 2011 Lancia introduced the final version called Ypsilon Unyca.

Production of the second generation Lancia Ypsilon ended on 23 November 2011 because Fiat Group closed the Termini Imerese factory where the Ypsilon was assembled. The third generation of Lancia Ypsilon is produced at Tychy in Poland.

Special edition

The Ypsilon was produced in two body colours version (called B-colore), which recalls Lancia tradition. The best-selling Ypsilons were the Passion, the Momo Design and Sport Momo Design characterized by the double body-colour, distinct from the top (roof, side mirrors and rear hatch) and the rest of the fairing, as well as some mostly sporty details (alloy wheels, interior). It derives directly from a concept called Ypsilon Sport, presented at the Geneva Motor Show in 2005 and developed in collaboration with Zagato Design Centre. It differs from the parent version of the engine, 1.4 Fire 95 PS and 1.3 Multijet 75, 90 and 105 horsepower, the four-disc braking system with lowered suspension, tires and its "sporty" design features.

In May 2008, as in 2006, the limited edition makeover ModaMilano returned with colour changes (TOP Borromini Grey colour), Bi-colour multi-spoke wheels, chrome trim and dashboard instrumentation cupolotto covered with skin.

Since 2009, the Ypsilon Versus was a limited edition of just 1,000, designed by Versace, with Bronzino Bronze body and interior. The Paris 2009 concept car was presented as Ypsilon Elle carried out in collaboration with the women's magazine. Elle was characterized by special pink bodywork and interior trim. Also in 2009, the Ypsilon E-Collection arrived, characterized by low environmental impact engines with reduced carbon dioxide emissions dioxide and B-body colour.

By 2011, the full range met the Euro 5 emission standard. It offered a new interior trim color palette. The  interior had parabolic mirrors painted in Gloss Black. In 2011 the Ypsilon Unyca debuted.

Engines
The engine range included a four-cylinder 1.2 Fire, expanded from 60 PS to 69 PS in October 2010. The 1.2 version was joined by a 16-valve, replaced in 2006 by a 1.4 Fire 8 valve . The 1.4 engine was produced in 95 PS 16-valve version, while the 1.4 8 valve was produced beginning in 2009 from  version EcoChic powered by LPG or petrol.

The 1.3 Multijet diesel engine was produced from 2003 to 2006. It was subsequently expanded to offer 90 and 105. The Multijet with D.P.F. had reduced emissions and fuel consumption.

Petrol
 1.2 8V 
 1.2 16V  (1st series)
 1.4 8V  (2nd series)
 1.4 16V

Diesel
 1.3 16V Multijet  (1st series)
 1.3 16V Multijet  –  (2nd series),  (MomoDesign)

All versions
 Lancia Ypsilon Argento (2003)
 Lancia Ypsilon Oro (2003)
 Lancia Ypsilon Platino (2003)
 Lancia Ypsilon Passion (2003) 
 Lancia Ypsilon B-Colore (2004)
 Lancia Ypsilon Black & Ivory (2004) (only in Switzerland)
 Lancia Ypsilon Glamour (2004) (only in Switzerland)
 Lancia Ypsilon MomoDesign (2005)
 Lancia Ypsilon Sport Zagato (2005) (prototype on the Geneva International Motor Show, never in production)
 Lancia Ypsilon Sport MomoDesign (2007)
 Lancia Ypsilon ModaMilano (2006 + 2008)
 Lancia Ypsilon Versace (2009)
 Lancia Ypsilon Versus (2009)
 Lancia Ypsilon Elle (2010)
 Lancia Ypsilon Unyca (2011)
 Lancia Ypsilon Diva (2011) (only in Italy)

Third generation (2011) 

The third generation was introduced at the Geneva Motor Show in 2011.

The first drawings of Type 846 were developed in late 2006 and early 2007 by the Lancia Style Centre, directed by Alberto Dilillo, before the Fiat/Chrysler alliance. The final model included only a few changes from the original, especially in the grille that recalls the style of most Chrysler models, with horizontal slats replacing the two lobes with vertical slats. As of 2022, it is the sole model available in Lancia's range.

The third series of Ypsilon adopted a five-door body with rear door handles recessed into the door's trailing edge.

The third generation shares the Fiat Mini platform with the Fiat 500 and Panda. Production was moved to Fiat's Tychy plant, reaching 100,000 units per year at full capacity. The front suspension continued with independent wheel MacPherson struts at the front and the semi-independent torsion beam with a stabilizer bar at the rear.

The body is 3.84 meters long with a wheelbase of 2.39 meters. The cabin is approved for 5 seats. At the launch up to 600 possible customization combinations with 16 exterior colors (including 4 Bi-color version).

Accessories included an automatic parking system, marketed as Magic Parking, bi-xenon headlights and LED rear lights in addition to available automatic Start & Stop.

All models were equipped with standard four airbags and stability and traction control (ESP and ASR) with Hill Holder, and ABS with EBD. European versions included Silver, Gold intermediate, and Platinum option packages. Type 846 continued to feature center-dash instrumentation.

Type 846 included a right-hand-drive variant for the UK and Ireland, where it was sold as the Chrysler Ypsilon. It is sold in Morocco and Israel through the Fiat dealer network. In 2012 it began selling in Japan under the Chrysler brand at Yanase Co., Ltd. Japanese dealerships. It isn't exported to the US in order to avoid competition with the Fiat 500, which is produced at Chrysler's Toluca plant in Mexico.

Special edition

At the 2011 Frankfurt Motor Show, Lancia debuted Ypsilon Diamond concept cars, which anticipated the release of a luxury model. The Diamond features two-tone paint with a top layer called "eco-chrome" covering pillars, roof, hood, and mirrors. The lower part of the body is painted in Chiffon Blanc (a particular kind of white). The interior is fully lined in leather and Alcantara with two-tone seats covered in Galuchat black bronze leather. Head restraints display the Y logo. The outside of the seats, dashboard and some door details are covered with Nubuck light-colored leather with shift knob made of transparent acrylic to get the diamond effect. The Ypsilon Diamond has remained a concept car only.

At the Bologna Motor Show in December 2011 Lancia presented the Ypsilon Black&Red, with special equipment proposed for young  buyers, including special paint and hi-fi audio. Offered in 4  paint styles (Rosso Argilla, Nero Vulcano, Rosso Fiamma, and the bi-color Rosso Argilla with roof and hood in Nero Vulcano) the interior offers the same color as the body with alternation of black and red. The Ypsilon Black&Red is sold in most markets (including UK and Ireland) with 1.2 Fire petrol engine, 0.9 TwinAir Turbo and 1.3 Multijet diesel.

Engines
Lancia Ypsilon 1.3 Multijet states for the consumption of 26.3 km/L.

Petrol
 1.2 8V  (from 2011 to August 2020)
 1.2 8V GPL  (Liquefied Petroleum Gas + petrol, from June 2011 on)
 0.9 TwinAir  (from 2011 to August 2018)
 0.9 TwinAir CNG  (Compressed Natural Gas + petrol, from January 2013)

Diesel
  1.3 16V Multijet  (from 2011 to August 2018)

Hybrid
 1.0 12V GSE FireFly BSG

2015 facelift

Premiered at Frankfurt International Salon, the new Ypsilon brings redesigned front end with a different lower bumper, featuring a horizontal bar, and new, wider, grille. Available will be two new colors: Blu di Blu, a classic Lancia tone, and Ivory Chic aimed at modern trends. All engines meet Euro 6 emission standards with Ecochic versions including LPG or methane fuelled. Inside, the UConnect infotainment system with a 5-inch LCD touch screen debuts, while the basic versions introduce a new DAB radio. New seat covers also make their debut. In September 2018 the engines were re-homologated according to Euro 6D-Temp regulations in the new WLTP cycle. The 1.3 Multijet diesel engine goes out of production following low sales.

Ypsilon EcoChic Hybrid
In March 2020 Lancia introduces the Ypsilon EcoChic Hybrid powered by the GSE FireFly 1.0-liter, three-cylinder gasoline engine that churns out , coupled to a 12-volt BSG (belt-integrated starter generator) electric motor.

The  electric motor draws power from a small 0.13 kWh lithium battery and the vehicle should reduce fuel consumption and emission by as much as 24 percent when compared to its non-hybrid counterpart. The Ypsilon Hybrid has a new 6-speed manual transmission and is homologated Euro 6D-Final.

All versions
 Lancia Ypsilon Silver (2011)
 Lancia Ypsilon Gold (2011)
 Lancia Ypsilon Platinum (2011)
 Lancia Ypsilon Ecochic LPG (In Italy: Ecochic GPL) (2011)
 Lancia Ypsilon Black&Red (2011)
 Lancia Ypsilon Black&Grey (2011)
 Lancia Ypsilon Ecochic CNG (In Italy: Ecochic Metano) (2013)
 Lancia Ypsilon Elefantino (Pink Elefantino) (2013)
 Lancia Ypsilon S Momodesign (2013)
 Lancia Ypsilon Park in Style (2013)
 Lancia Ypsilon Elefantino (Lime, Coconut, Watermelon Elefantino) (2014)
 Lancia Ypsilon Elle (2014)
 Lancia Ypsilon 30th Anniversary (2015)
 Lancia Ypsilon Mya (2016)
 Lancia Ypsilon Unyca (2017)
 Lancia Ypsilon Elefantino Blu (2018)
 Lancia Ypsilon Black and Noir (2019)
 Lancia Ypsilon Monogram (2019)
 Lancia Ypsilon Hybrid EcoChic Silver (2020)
 Lancia Ypsilon Hybrid EcoChic Gold (2020)
 Lancia Ypsilon Hybrid EcoChic Maryne (2020)
 Lancia Ypsilon Alberta Ferretti (2021)

Safety
The Ypsilon was awarded 2 stars in the Euro NCAP crash test in 2015.

2021 facelift

In 2021 Stellantis gave the car a grille with vertical strips according to the Lancia tradition and updated headlights with new daytime running lights. It was also announced that the maker will now be considered a premium car maker and will be part of the Stellantis group's "premium pool" sharing parts with DS and Alfa Romeo.

Notes

References

External links

 
 Lancia Ypsilon Elefantino 1.2 Start&Stop Exterior and Interior in 3D 4K UHD
 Official Lancia video presentation of 2015 facelift

Ypsilon
Subcompact cars
Hatchbacks
Euro NCAP superminis
2000s cars
2010s cars
Cars introduced in 1996